The following is a list of notable punk rap artists.

 6ix9ine
 Abdu Ali
 Backxwash
 Blackie
 Body Count
 Chief Keef
 Cities Aviv
 City Morgue
 Dead Obies

 Death Grips
 Denzel Curry
 Future
 Ho99o9
 JPEGMAFIA
 Kevin Abstract
 Lil Peep
 Lil Pump
 Lil Uzi Vert
 Lil Yachty
 Lil Wayne
 Nothing,Nowhere
 Playboi Carti
 Public Enemy
 Rico Nasty
 Show Me the Body
 Slowthai
 Ski mask the Slump god
 Smokepurpp
 Suicideboys
 Time Zone
 Travis Scott
Waka Flocka Flame
 XXXTENTACION

References

Lists of hip hop musicians
Lists of punk bands